Exaeretia thoracenigraeella is a moth in the family Depressariidae. It is found in North America, where it has been recorded from California and Oregon.

The wingspan is 16–20 mm. The forewings are pale ochreous-grey, with a blackish fuscous base. There is a fuscous shade from the costa to the middle of the cell, edged above and below with brown and preceded by a conspicuous outwardly oblique black dash. There is a series of greyish-fuscous spots on the costa and around the termen. The hindwings are brownish fuscous.

References

Moths described in 1875
Exaeretia
Moths of North America